Suhas Pagolu is an Indian actor who works in Telugu films. He initially appeared in short films and supporting roles, and made his debut in a lead role with Colour Photo (2020).

Early life and career 
Suhas was born and brought up in Vijayawada, Andhra Pradesh. After graduating from KBN College, Suhas moved to Hyderabad to pursue a career in films. He started acting in a Telugu YouTube channel Chai Bisket and was featured in several short films including The Athidhi by Sandeep Raj and Kalakaarudu.

Suhas made his film debut with Padi Padi Leche Manasu (2018) and has played supporting roles in several films including Agent Sai Srinivasa Athreya (2019). In a review of the film by The Times of India, the reviewer wrote that "Suhas makes an impressive cameo as Detective Bobby". He appeared in Majili (2019), after which, he is sometimes referred to as "Majili Suhas".

He reprised the role played by Soubin Shahir in Maheshinte Prathikaaram in the Telugu remake Uma Maheswara Ugra Roopasya, alongside Satyadev Kancharana. Suhas then collaborated with his best friend Sandeep Raj for Colour Photo. He made his debut in a lead role with this film, which stars Sunil as the antagonist. His role in the film as a lead was critically praised and received wide recognition. 

In 2021, he starred in Gamanam and Family Drama, in which he played the role of a serial killer. HIT: The Second Case and Mishan Impossible were his releases in 2022.

Personal life 
Suhas married Lalitha in August 2017.

Filmography

Feature films

Short films 
The Athidi
Kalakaarudu
Radhika
Nandan – A Psycho Thriller
Bangaram
Nenorakam

Television

References

External links 

Living people
Telugu comedians
Indian YouTubers
Indian male comedians
Indian film actors
Indian male actors
Male actors from Vijayawada
Telugu male actors
Indian male film actors
1990 births